Fosthietan (chemical formula:) is a chemical compound used in insecticides and nematicides.

References

Insecticides
Phosphoramidates
Dithietanes
Ethyl esters
Nematicides